Lygus punctatus is a species of plant bug in the family Miridae.

Distribution
This species can be found in most Europe and Northern Asia (excluding China), North America, and Southern Asia.

Description
These bugs have shining and more or less distinct reddish, orange-red or brownish red pronotum and hemelytra. Lateral margin of pronotum is rounded. Scutellum is deeply punctate and not swollen. Middle  of corium  is less densely  and  less coarsely punctate than other parts of hemelytra.

Biology
Adults have been recorded highly abundant on alfalfa (Medicago sativa).

References

Further reading

 
 

Lygus
Articles created by Qbugbot
Insects described in 1838